A cryovolcano (sometimes informally called an ice volcano) is a type of volcano that erupts volatiles such as water, ammonia or methane into an extremely cold environment that is at or below their freezing point. The process of formation is known as cryovolcanism.  Collectively referred to as cryomagma, cryolava or ice-volcanic melt, these substances are usually liquids and can form plumes, but can also be in vapour form. After the eruption, cryomagma is expected to condense to a solid form when exposed to the very low surrounding temperature. Cryovolcanoes may potentially form on icy moons and other objects with abundant water past the Solar System's snow line (such as Pluto). A number of features have been identified as possible cryovolcanoes on Pluto, Titan and Ceres, and a subset of domes on Europa may have cryovolcanic origins. In addition, although they are not known to form volcanoes, ice geysers have been observed on Enceladus and potentially Triton.

One potential energy source on some solar system bodies for melting ices and producing cryovolcanoes is tidal friction.

Signs of past warming of the Kuiper belt object Quaoar have led scientists to speculate that it exhibited cryovolcanism in the past.

Observations

On November 27, 2005, Cassini photographed geysers on the south pole of Enceladus. (See also: Enceladus (cryovolcanism).)

Indirect evidence of cryovolcanic activity was later observed on several other icy moons of the Solar System, including Europa, Titan, Ganymede, and Miranda. Cassini has observed several features thought to be cryovolcanoes on Titan, notably Doom Mons with adjacent Sotra Patera, a feature regarded as "the very best evidence, by far, for volcanic topography anywhere documented on an icy satellite." Cryovolcanism is one process hypothesized to be a significant source of the methane found in Titan's atmosphere.

In 2007, observations by the Gemini Observatory showing patches of ammonia hydrates and water crystals on the surface of Pluto's moon Charon suggested the presence of active cryovolcanoes or cryogeysers. Subsequent observations by New Horizons in 2015 found that Charon has a youthful surface, supporting this idea. Pluto itself has two features that have been identified as possible cryovolcanoes, being mountains with indented peaks.

In 2015, two distinct bright spots inside a crater of the dwarf planet Ceres were imaged by the Dawn spacecraft, leading to speculation about a possible cryovolcanic origin.
In September 2016, NASA JPL and NASA Goddard scientists released findings that the large Ahuna Dome on Ceres is a "volcanic dome unlike any seen elsewhere in the solar system. [The large] mountain is likely volcanic in nature. Specifically, it would be a cryovolcano -- a volcano that erupts a liquid made of volatiles such as water, instead of silicates. ... the only known example of a cryovolcano that potentially formed from a salty mud mix, and that formed in the geologically recent past." In addition, at least some of Ceres' well-known bright spots (notably including the ones in Occator crater) are likely also cryovolcanic in origin. A study published in March 2017 suggests that Occator's most recent large eruption occurred about 4 million years ago and thus that Ceres may still be active.

See also

References

External links
 Triton - Triton at the eight Planets
 South Pole of Triton - Triton at SolarViews.com
 Enceladus' South Polar Stripes Spew "Warm" Water - News article at the Planetary Society
 Cryovolcanism on Charon and other Kuiper Belt Objects
 Ice Volcanoes of Lake Superior's South Shore
 
 

Volcanology
Planetary geology